The following railroads merged to form CSX Transportation.

The Seaboard System Railroad merged with Chessie System which consisted of the Baltimore and Ohio Railroad and Chesapeake and Ohio Railway and Western Maryland Railroad to form CSX Transportation July 1, 1986.
The Seaboard Coast Line Railroad merged with the Louisville and Nashville Railroad and others to form the Seaboard System Railroad December 29, 1982.
The Atlantic Coast Line Railroad merged with the Seaboard Air Line Railroad to form the Seaboard Coast Line Railroad July 1, 1967.
The Charleston and Western Carolina Railway merged into the Atlantic Coast Line Railroad December 31, 1959.
The Seaboard Air Line Railroad merged with the Atlantic Coast Line Railroad to form the Seaboard Coast Line Railroad July 1, 1967.
The Piedmont and Northern Railway merged into the Seaboard Coast Line Railroad July 1, 1969.
The Louisville and Nashville Railroad merged with the Seaboard Coast Line Railroad and others to form the Seaboard System Railroad December 29, 1982.
The Nashville, Chattanooga and St. Louis Railway merged into the Louisville and Nashville Railroad August 30, 1957.
The Monon Railroad merged into the Louisville and Nashville Railroad July 31, 1971.
The Georgia Railroad merged into the Seaboard System Railroad in 1983.
The Chesapeake and Ohio Railway merged into CSX Transportation August 31, 1987.
The Baltimore and Ohio Railroad merged into the CSX Transportation August 31, 1987.
The Western Maryland Railway merged  with others to form  CSX July 1, 1986.
The Pere Marquette Railway merged into the Chesapeake and Ohio Railway June 6, 1947.
The Richmond, Fredericksburg and Potomac Railroad, which was majority-owned by CSX, merged into CSX Transportation in 1991.
The Pittsburgh and Lake Erie Railroad, of which part had been used by the Baltimore and Ohio Railroad, sold that portion to CSX Transportation in 1991. On September 11, 1992, CSX Transportation bought the rest through the Three Rivers Railway.
Atlanta and West Point Railroad
Baltimore and Ohio Chicago Terminal Railroad
Chessie System
Clinchfield Railroad
New York, New Haven and Hartford Railroad merged with Pennsylvania Railroad and New York Central Railroad to form Penn Central
Western Railway of Alabama
Pennsylvania Railroad
 New York Central
 Penn Central Transportation Company
 Erie Railroad merged with Delaware, Lackawanna and Western to from Erie Lackawanna
 Delaware, Lackawanna and Western Railroad merged with Erie Railroad to form Erie Lackawanna
 Erie Lackawanna Railway
 Lehigh Valley Railroad
 Reading Company
 Central Railroad of New Jersey
 Lehigh and Hudson River Railway
 Pennsylvania-Reading Seashore Lines
 Monongahela Railroad
 Conrail
 Chicago and Eastern Illinois Railroad Merged into Louisville and Nashville in 1976

References
CSX merger family tree, Trains

 
CSX Transportation predecessor railroads